
The following are lists of American theatrical animated feature films by decade:

Lists 
 List of American theatrical animated feature films (1937–1999)
 List of American theatrical animated feature films (2000–2019)
 List of American theatrical animated feature films (2020–present)

 Feature
Feature
Feature